Lieutenant colonel James Inglis Hamilton (born Jamie Anderson, 4 July 1777 – 18 June 1815) was a Colonel in the British Army killed at the Battle of Waterloo.

Early life 
He was born as Jamie Anderson on 4 July 1777 at a camp of the Saratoga Campaign in New York. He was the second son of William Anderson, a Sergeant-Major of the 21st Foot. Hamilton was baptized on 28 August 1777. General James Inglis Hamilton adopted him following the Battle of Bemis Heights, and funded his education at Glasgow Grammar School and the University of Glasgow .

Military career 
Hamilton's adopted father opened a spot in the British Army and Hamilton became a cornet in the Royal Scots Greys in 1792. This is when he changed his name to James Hamilton. Hamilton was promoted to lieutenant on 4October 1793. On 15April 1794, he was promoted to captain. Hamilton became a major on 17February 1803. He was promoted to lieutenant colonel on 16June 1807, and he commanded the Royal Scots Greys. On 4 June 1814, Hamilton was promoted to Colonel.

Battle of Waterloo 

By the time of the Battle of Waterloo he was a Lt. Colonel, commanding the Royal Scots Greys. While leading a charge on horseback, he lost his left arm. He put the reins in his mouth and continued the charge, even after his right arm was severed by a French lancer. Moments later he was shot and killed. He was found with a bullet wound through his heart, as well as other injuries; Hamilton's scabbard and silken sash were sent to his brother, Lieutenant Jno. Anderson, who died in Glasgow on 3December 1816 from wounds received at the Battle of Salamanca.

Personal life 
Hamilton married Mary Inglis Payne. Upon Hamilton's death, Payne was compensated £200.

He inherited Murdostoun Castle from his father on 18 August 1803.

Notes

References 
 
 
 
 
 

1777 births
1815 deaths
Royal Scots Greys officers
British military personnel killed in action in the Napoleonic Wars
British Army commanders of the Napoleonic Wars
British adoptees